Jean-Pierre Guéron (born 24 August 1944) is a Swiss speed skater. He competed in two events at the 1964 Winter Olympics.

References

1944 births
Living people
Swiss male speed skaters
Olympic speed skaters of Switzerland
Speed skaters at the 1964 Winter Olympics
Sportspeople from Geneva